Greatest Hits is a compilation album by heavy metal band Dokken. It is a collection of re-recorded 1980s hits along with two new tracks. On March 1, 2010, it was digitally released to iTunes and Amazon.com. The physical album with additional tracks was released in the US by Cleopatra Records on May 4, 2010, and in Japan on May 11, 2010, by King Records. On June 14, 2011, it was re-released by Store For Music LTD under the new title The Anthems with a new cover. The Anthems contains both of the bonus tracks from the Japanese edition of Greatest Hits.

Track listing
"Just Got Lucky" (George Lynch, Jeff Pilson) - 4:35
"Breaking the Chains" (Don Dokken, Lynch) - 3:51
"Into the Fire" (Dokken, Lynch, Pilson) - 4:29
"The Hunter" (Dokken, Lynch, Pilson, Mick Brown) - 4:04
"In My Dreams" (Dokken, Lynch, Pilson, Brown) - 4:33
"It's Not Love" (Dokken, Lynch, Pilson, Brown) - 5:03
"Alone Again" (Dokken, Pilson) - 4:24
"Dream Warriors" (Lynch, Pilson)- 4:46
"Unchain the Night" (Dokken, Lynch, Pilson, Brown) - 5:22
"Tooth and Nail" (Lynch, Pilson, Brown) - 3:38
"Almost Over" (Dokken, Jon Levin) - 5:54 (2010 new track)
"Magic Man" (Dokken, Levin) - 3:53 (2010 new track)

Japanese edition bonus tracks
"Bus Stop" (Graham Gouldman) - 3:38 (The Hollies cover)
"Lies" (Buddy Randell, Beau Charles) - 2:46 (The Knickerbockers cover)

Personnel

Dokken
Don Dokken – vocals
Jon Levin – lead and rhythm guitars
George Lynch - lead and rhythm guitars
Barry Sparks - bass guitar
Sean McNabb – bass guitar on tracks 13 and 14
Mick Brown – drums, lead vocals on track 14

Production
Mike Lesniak, Darian Rundall - engineers
Michael Wagener, Wyn Davis - mixing
Mike Sutherland - mixing assistant

References

Dokken compilation albums
2010 albums
Cleopatra Records compilation albums
King Records (Japan) compilation albums